The Roman Catholic Diocese of Cartago may refer to:
 Roman Catholic Diocese of Cartago in Costa Rica
 Roman Catholic Diocese of Cartago in Colombia